Doha Agreement may refer to:

Doha Agreement (2008), agreement between rival Lebanese factions
Fatah–Hamas Doha Agreement, 2012
Doha Agreement (2020), agreement between United States and the Taliban